The 1996 Final Peace Agreement, also called the Jakarta Accord was signed on September 2, 1996 in Manila, Philippines by Manuel Yan, representing the Government of the Philippines and Nur Misuari of the Moro National Liberation Front. The culmination of four years of peace talks, the agreement established mechanisms designed to bring about the full implementation of the 1976 Tripoli Agreement.

Previous treaties

In 1976, the Philippine government and the MNLF had agreed to submit the proposal of regional autonomy for thirteen provinces in the southern Philippines to a plebiscite. However, then Philippine President Ferdinand Marcos implemented the agreement by creating two autonomous regions (instead of one) consisting of ten (instead of thirteen) provinces. This led to the collapse of the peace pact and the resumption of hostilities between the MNLF and Philippine government forces.

A year after Marcos was ousted from power during the People Power Revolution, the government under Corazon Aquino signed the 1987 Jeddah Accord in Saudi Arabia with the MNLF, agreeing to hold further discussions on the proposal for autonomy to the entirety of Mindanao and not just the thirteen provinces stated in the 1976 Tripoli Agreement. In 1989, however, an act establishing the Autonomous Region in Muslim Mindanao was passed. The MNLF demanded that the thirteen Tripoli Agreement provinces be included in the ARMM, but the government refused; eight of those provinces, due to continuous Resettlement Policy all throughout silence of Peace Process were now predominantly Christian populated. Shortly thereafter, the government held a plebiscite in the thirteen provinces. Four provinces; Lanao del Sur, Maguindanao, Sulu and Tawi-tawi voted to be included in the ARMM. The MNLF boycotted the plebiscite and refused to recognize the ARMM.

The agreement

Background
In the early 1990s, the Organization of Islamic Conference expanded its Quadripartite Ministerial Commission, which had been facilitating peace talks between the Philippine Government and the MNLF. The Ministerial Committee of Six, as it was now called, included the new members represented by Indonesia and Bangladesh, as well as the four members of the original ministerial commission, Libya, Saudi Arabia, Senegal and Somalia. Indonesia became the committee chair mediating the talks between the Philippine government and the MNLF.

When an interim ceasefire agreement was signed in 1993, Indonesia as a member of ASEAN became responsible for implementing the ceasefire and provided personnel as ceasefire monitors. Philippine President Fidel V. Ramos encouraged the participation of Indonesia and the OIC; further peace talks were held and representatives from both parties met in Jakarta. Indonesia facilitated the Jakarta Agreement in 1996, which was supposed to lead to the full implementation of the 1976 Tripoli Agreement.

Phases of implementation
The 1996 Final Peace Agreement divided the mechanism for implementation of the 1976 Tripoli agreement into two phases:

Phase I – Three years were allotted for the establishment of the Special Zone of Peace and Development, the Southern Philippines Council for Peace and Development (SPCPD) and the Consultative Assembly. At this point, the agreement enabled qualified MNLF members to enter the ranks of the Armed Forces of the Philippines and the Philippine National Police. The Southern Philippines Council for Peace and Development was dominated by the MNLF. Misuari then ran unopposed as governor of the ARMM.
Phase II – This aspect involved the repeal or amendment of Republic Act No. 6734, otherwise known as the Organic Act which established the ARMM, through Congressional action and the subsequent submission of the amended law to the people of the affected areas via plebiscite. This was to be done within two years from the establishment of the SPCPD.

The peace agreement earned Ramos and Misuari the 1997 Félix Houphouët-Boigny Peace Prize.

Succeeding treaties
The Moro Islamic Liberation Front, a faction of the MNLF which had broken away in 1977, initially supported the MNLF during the peace talks. They however, rejected the 1996 Final Peace Agreement as inadequate, reiterating a demand for a "Bangsamoro Islamic State", and not just simple political autonomy. That same year, the MILF began informal talks with the Ramos-led government. These, however, were not pursued and the MILF began recruiting and establishing camps, becoming the dominant Muslim rebel group. The administration of Joseph Estrada advocated a hardline stance against the MILF; that of Gloria Macapagal Arroyo tried to sign a peace agreement with it, but it was declared unconstitutional by the Supreme Court of the Philippines.

Shortly after Benigno Aquino III assumed the Presidency in 2010, he met with MILF chairman Murad Ebrahim in Tokyo, Japan. In 2012, the Philippine government and the MILF signed the Framework Agreement on the Bangsamoro, which calls for the creation of the Bangsamoro, an autonomous political entity which will replace the Autonomous Region in Muslim Mindanao, which Aquino describes as a "failed experiment".

See also
1976 Tripoli Agreement
1987 Jeddah Accord
Framework Agreement on the Bangsamoro

External links
Text of the 1996 Final Peace Agreement on the Philippines' Office of the Presidential Adviser on the Peace Process website

References

1996 in the Philippines
Bangsamoro peace process
Boundary treaties
Treaties concluded in 1996
Treaties of the Philippines
Presidency of Fidel V. Ramos
Moro National Liberation Front